Tomas Žvirgždauskas (born 18 March 1975) is a retired football defender from Lithuania, who last played as defender for Halmstads BK.

Career
His career started in Zalgiris Vilnius, where he won the Lithuanian league title twice. In 1995, he moved to Danish team, Naestved BK, but only played a few games before moving back to Zalgiris Vilnius the following year. His return to Lithuania was short, as he moved yet again shortly thereafter to the Polish Premier League and the team Polonia Warszawa in January 1997, where he won the title. He later played a short period for Widzew Lodz, then going on a trial at the Israeli club, Hapoel Be'er Sheva, but failed to get a contract. In September 2002, he signed a contract with the Swedish club, Halmstads BK. Žvirgždauskas formed along with Tommy Jönsson a long lasting central defence at Halmstad, lasting until 2009 as Johnny Lundberg arrived at the club, he then created a defence with Lundberg, taking over Jönssons position on the left of the central part of the defence. As Lundberg suffered a severe injury in 2011, Žvirgždauskas had to pair up with rising talent Richard Magyar. Prior to the 2012 season Halmstads BK announced that they would not renew Žvirgždauskas contract and he would leave the club, he had then played 307 matches for Halmstads BK.

In 2006, he received a 1-month ban after assaulting IK Brage forward, Mats Theander, in a friendly match.

International career
Tomas Žvirgždauskas started his national career for Lithuania in 1998 with a friendly against Azerbaijan. Eventually becoming a starting player in the national team until his retiring in 2008. He however returned to the national team in 2011 for a friendly against Poland and was an unused substitute in the UEFA Euro 2012 qualifying match against Spain at home.

Žvirgždauskas have played 56 international games for Lithuania.

Personal life

He lives with his wife, Aorsra, and their two children, Patricia and Jostas. His father died in 1993 due to a heart attack.

In his youth, he played basketball. While his father wanted him to be a boxer, he stopped when his mother, a doctor, forbade him, due to her fear of seeing him get hurt.

In every league he has played he has used nicknames rather than his own last name due to pronunciation difficulties, in Lithuania he was called Žvirgždas, in Poland Zvirac and in Sweden Zvirre.

Honours

Club

 Zalgiris Vilnius
 A Lyga: 1991, 1991–92
 Lithuanian Football Cup: 1991, 1993, 1994

 Polonia Warsaw
 Ekstraklasa: 2000
 Polish SuperCup: 2000
 Ekstraklasa Cup: 2000

References

External links
 Club bio 
 Swedish FA bio 
 

1975 births
Living people
Lithuanian footballers
Lithuania international footballers
Lithuania under-21 international footballers
A Lyga players
Danish Superliga players
Ekstraklasa players
Allsvenskan players
Expatriate men's footballers in Denmark
Expatriate footballers in Poland
Expatriate footballers in Sweden
FK Žalgiris players
Polonia Warsaw players
Widzew Łódź players
Næstved Boldklub players
Halmstads BK players
Lithuanian expatriate sportspeople in Poland
Sportspeople from Vilnius
Association football defenders
Lithuanian expatriate sportspeople in Denmark
Lithuanian expatriate sportspeople in Sweden